Jacqueline "Jacky" Perkins is a British diplomat who has been the British Ambassador to Belarus since 2019. Previous to that, she was the deputy head of mission in Kuwait.

Consular career
Perkins joined the Foreign and Commonwealth Office in 1989 as an Assistant Desk Officer for the East Africa Department. In 1990, she underwent full-time Arabic language training courses and after two years was posted to the British Embassy in Abu Dhabi.

In 1995, she was recalled to become the head of the Germany and Austria Section in the West Europe Department of the FCO. She stayed at the FCO in various posts until 1999 when she became the Head of Political, Economic and Development Section in Cairo. From 2003 until 2008, she was a regional adviser in Bahrain and in 2008, she became a Strategic Policy Adviser at the FCO's Strategy Unit. She became the Deputy Head of Mission in Kuwait in 2013, a post she held until 2018.

In 2018, Perkins underwent an intensive Russian language course. She was announced as the new UK Ambassador to Belarus and the successor to Fionna Gibb in June 2019, and took up her post in August.

In October 2019, Perkins called on Belarus to drop the death penalty as part of International Day Against the Death Penalty. In February 2020, Perkins said she was trying to "maintain momentum" in increased international trade and does not expect any changes after Brexit. In October 2020, Foreign Secretary Dominic Raab temporarily recalled Perkins amid civil unrest in Belarus triggered by allegations of electoral fraud against President Alexander Lukashenko.

Personal life
Perkins has a degree in Modern Languages from Cambridge University and a MA in International Relations from the University of Notre Dame, Indiana. She has two children.

References

Living people
People from Cornwall
Ambassadors of the United Kingdom to Belarus
Alumni of the University of Cambridge
University of Notre Dame alumni
Year of birth missing (living people)
British women ambassadors